Xiqu Subdistrict, also known as West Subdistrict or Western Subdistrict is a subdistrict directly administered by the city of Zhongshan, Guangdong province, China. It is a main industrial and commercial centre of the city. , it has nine residential neighborhoods under its administration:
Yanzhou Community
Guangfeng Community
Xiyuan Community
Changzhou Community
Houshan Community
Shalang Community
Longchang Community
Longping Community
Caihong Community

Economy
The video game company Subor has its headquarters here.

References

External links

Official website of West District, Zhongshan 

Zhongshan
Township-level divisions of Guangdong